Sha'Keela Saunders (born December 18, 1993) is an American track and field athlete who competes in the long jump. Saunders finished third at the long jump final at the 2017 IAAF Diamond League and 2018 IAAF Diamond League. She represented her country at the 2017 World Championships in Athletics and won gold at NACAC Championships.

Professional career
In Fall 2022, coach Sha'Keela Saunders joined Hampton University track and field staff.

National championships

University of Kentucky
Sha'Keela Saunders is a 2017 NCAA Division I Indoor track and field Long jump champion. Sha'Keela Saunders earned 13-time NCAA Division I All-America honors. Sha'Keela Saunders first broke the University of Kentucky Wildcats school record in the long jump for the first time  en route to a first-place finish at the 2015 University of Kentucky Rod McCravy Memorial Track & Field Meet at Southeastern Conference for Women's Indoor Track and Field.

Sha'Keela Saunders improved on the University of Kentucky Wildcats school record in the Triple jump  but in the same meet (2017 SEC Outdoor Championship on ESPNU) her teammate Marie Josée Ebwea Bile improved on that record . Saunders was named to the Bowerman Award watch list in 2017.

Prep
Saunders is a 2012 graduate of Nansemond River High School in Virginia.

References

External links

IAAF Diamond League profile

1993 births
Living people
Track and field athletes from Virginia
American female long jumpers
American female triple jumpers
World Athletics Championships athletes for the United States
University of Kentucky alumni
Sportswomen from Kentucky
People from Elizabeth City, North Carolina
Sportspeople from Suffolk, Virginia
USA Outdoor Track and Field Championships winners
Pan American Games medalists in athletics (track and field)
Pan American Games bronze medalists for the United States
Athletes (track and field) at the 2015 Pan American Games
Medalists at the 2015 Pan American Games
21st-century American women
Kentucky Wildcats women's track and field athletes